"Bang Bang Bang" is a song recorded by South Korean boy band Big Bang. Initially released as part of the single album A on June 1, 2015, through YG Entertainment, the song served as one of the eight lead singles from the band's third Korean-language studio album Made, which would be released more than a year later on December 12, 2016. It was written and composed by member G-Dragon along with long-time group collaborator Teddy Park, with additional rap parts penned by member T.O.P.

The track won Song of the Year at 2015 Mnet Asian Music Awards, making the group the second act to be awarded this prize twice. "Bang Bang Bang" was a commercial success, ranking as the best-selling and most-streamed single in South Korea of 2015. It also peaked atop the Billboard World Digital Song Sales chart. In Japan, the single peaked at number two on the Japan Hot 100 and was awarded Asian Song of the Year at the Japan Gold Disc Award for two consecutive years, in 2016 and 2017. With over five million downloads sold across Asia, "Bang Bang Bang" is among the band's best-selling works.

Background and promotion
The first poster titled "Bang Bang Bang" was released on May 27. YG Entertainment's then-CEO Yang Hyun-suk commented that the song was "the most powerful music you have ever heard before." Before its release on June 1 at midnight, the members hosted a live streaming on the app V from the news portal Naver, where they talked about the new songs and answered fans questions. The first televised live performance was held in the Mnet music show M Countdown along with "We Like 2 Party". The group also appeared on the talk show You Hee-yeol's Sketchbook to perform the single.

"Bang Bang Bang" was translated for Japanese to be included in their album Made Series (2016). The Japanese version gained a new music video, that is essentially the same as the Korean original, but edited to be shorter in length. This version was performed in the Japanese TV shows Music Station, Momm!!, Space Shower TV, among others.

Composition 

"Bang Bang Bang"s verses feature a dance beat that were described as "'90s inspired", reminiscent of Diplo and Disclosure, with a "quasi-Migos flow over a hi-NRG" sound. The song then shifts into a "trap-heavy breakdown" in the chorus, and culminating into another breakdown, with chants of "Let the bass drum go". Additionally, "reverberating synths filt" throughout the track, "playing off the pounding rhythm and powerful horns", giving "Bang Bang Bang" a "chaotic environment". The chorus features the hook "Like you've been shot, bang bang bang", which was noted for being "less onomatopoeic and more a homage to the band."

Commercial performance
"Bang Bang Bang" had the highest first-week sales in 2015 by a group on the Gaon Chart, with 339,856 downloads sold. It peaked at number one on the Gaon Digital Chart. By the end of June, "Bang Bang Bang" was number one on the monthly digital chart, with a total of 681,111 digital sales and 26.472 million streams. On July, 2016 the song surpassed 2 million downloads and 100 million streams in South Korea.

The single held the two top spots on the Billboard World Digital Songs chart along with "We Like 2 Party", the second time for the group after the previous release M, which led them tying with Psy's record, for being the only K-pop act to hold the top two slots on the chart twice. "Bang Bang Bang" was also the biggest K-Pop song of 2015's summer in the same chart and the most watched music video in the United States in the season.

In France, the song debuted at number 194 in the chart issue dated June 13, 2015, the first time a male K-pop group entered the singles chart. In Japan, the song peaked at number two on the Billboard Japan Hot 100. The single also ranked second as the most popular Korean singles in 2015 in Taiwan by music streaming service KKBox. In 2017, the song ranked first place on the top 10 tracks of the year in the Japanese version of KKBox.

Accolades
"Bang Bang Bang" received numerous accolades, including Song of the Year at the annual Mnet Asian Music Awards and Melon Music Awards. It was named one of the top ten international gold songs at the 2016 RTHK International Pop Poll Awards and won two Song of the Year by Download accolades from the Japan Gold Disc Award in 2016 and 2017. Additionally, "Bang Bang Bang" received four consecutive Melon Weekly Popularity Awards.

Critical reception
Billboard placed the track at the tenth spot in their best BigBang songs list, calling the single "impossible to ignore," stating that, even though "the sudden shift in pacing throughout the single come off as jarring upon first listen," the track's "stuttering rhythm," "chaotic environment" and "frenzied energy" makes the song "all that more compelling." Sun-Times included "Bang Bang Bang" in their unranked list of ten best BigBang songs, claiming that "this club-ready track takes classic Big Bang swagger to new levels of sophistication."

The Muse felt that the single "savvily hits every note, including anthemic trap breakdown" describing the song as "literally, lit." Fuse compared the song to their 2012 single "Fantastic Baby", hailing both as "nonstop party" tracks. KKBox praised the track's energetic sound, and hailed "Bang Bang Bang" a classical song from the band. Thump choose it as one of best songs of summer, feeling that the "multi-genre banger" is "fire in any language, in any country."

Music video
"Bang Bang Bang" music video was directed by Seo Hyun-seung and choreographed by Parris Goebel, who makes an appearance on the video. The video was well received by critics. Jeff Benjamin from Fuse described it as "an over-the-top affair, with the guys rocking a slew of wild looks, hairdos and fashions in a neon-tinged world," while Eric Ducker from Rolling Stone claimed that "nothing from [this year] really beats the explosive grandiosity of 'Bang Bang Bang' from genre legends Big Bang." Billboard highlighted the members' "boundary pushing" high-fashion. Stereogum hailed it an "insanely epic video," and admired the video's "beautiful, absurd riot of glitter and pink hair and hydraulic low-riders and flamethrowers and tricked-out motorcycles and grenade launchers and studded leather and androgynous models on leashes and anti-aircraft guns and cowboy hats and Buckingham Palace guard hats and assault vehicles being driven like chariots." Stereogum ranked the music video at number 14 in their list of the 50 Best Music Videos of 2015, the only non-English work mentioned.  Miami New Times wrote that the "bombastic" video highlights "what the Hallyu is all about", featuring "insane costumes, dynamic dancing, and production values that match, even surpass, those of their Western competitors."

The video was the most viewed K-Pop group video of 2015 and second of all time, only behind their own "Fantastic Baby." On January 19, 2016, it reached 100 million views on YouTube, the second music video by a K-Pop boy group to do so. It became the second K-pop group music video to surpass 200 million views on January 11, 2017.

Controversy 
The group was criticized for appropriating Native American culture because of the war bonnet, worn only by those who have earned the highest honors in their tribes, Seungri wears in the video. The Muse described the incident as "another example of K-pop appropriation" stating that "Western culture's various racial stereotypes" are "consumed and blown-out" by the genre "that it almost seems like an avenue in which to decentralize and possibly even defang some of those."

Impact
"Bang Bang Bang" topped the Gallup Korea annual poll of nationwide Koreans between the ages of 13 to 59 for Song of the Year. The song was chosen by the South Korean government to be a part of the loudspeaker propaganda broadcast into North Korean borders, in response to the January 2016 nuclear tests. It was also sung by Seoul university students during the 2016 South Korean protests for the resignation of president Park Geun-hye.

Chart performance

Weekly charts

Year-end charts

Sales and certifications

Release history

References

BigBang (South Korean band) songs
2015 singles
2015 songs
Korean-language songs
Songs written by Teddy Park
Songs written by G-Dragon
Songs written by T.O.P
Gaon Digital Chart number-one singles
YG Entertainment singles
Music video controversies